Nash Stream is a  river in northern New Hampshire in the United States. It is a tributary of the Upper Ammonoosuc River and part of the Connecticut River watershed.

Nash Stream rises on the western slopes of Whitcomb Mountain in the township of Odell, New Hampshire, and flows west briefly into the town of Columbia before turning south-southwest to flow through Odell and the town of Stratford, joining the Upper Ammonoosuc River in the town of Stark. Near its headwaters, it passes through Nash Bog Pond, an extensive marshy area which used to be a large pond closed by a dam. The dam washed out in the 1960s. Nearly the entire stream is within the boundaries of the Nash Stream Forest, owned by the state of New Hampshire.

The Nash Stream watershed is surrounded by mountains. The most commonly hiked are North and South Percy Peaks, barren summits offering extensive views reached by a trail, and Sugarloaf, reached by a trail which formerly gave access to a fire tower.

Nash Stream Forest Management Plan 

 2017 Nash Stream Forest Management Plan Revision
 2002 Nash Stream Forest Management Plan Updates and Revisions
 1995 Nash Stream Forest Management Plan

See also 

 List of New Hampshire rivers

References

Rivers of New Hampshire
Tributaries of the Connecticut River
Rivers of Coös County, New Hampshire